The Trade Union Congress of Tanzania (TUCTA) is a national trade union center in Tanzania. It has a membership of 320,000 and was formed in 2000 after the dissolution of the Tanzania Federation of Free Trade Unions (TFTU).

The TUCTA is affiliated with the International Trade Union Confederation.

References

Trade unions in Tanzania
International Trade Union Confederation
Trade unions established in 2000
2000 establishments in Tanzania
National federations of trade unions